Alexander Harrison Byrne (6 June 1933 – 31 October 2020) was a Scottish professional footballer who played as a left winger.

Career
Born in Greenock, Byrne played youth football in Scotland and England for Gourock, Royal Engineers and Cheltenham Town. He later played in the Scottish Football League for Celtic, Greenock Morton and Queen of the South, before playing in Australia for Hellas.

His death at the age of 87 was announced by former club Celtic on 9 November 2020.

References

1933 births
2020 deaths
Scottish footballers
Royal Engineers A.F.C. players
Cheltenham Town F.C. players
Celtic F.C. players
Greenock Morton F.C. players
Queen of the South F.C. players
Scottish Football League players
West Adelaide SC players
Scottish expatriate footballers
Expatriate soccer players in Australia
Footballers from Greenock
Association football wingers
Scottish expatriate sportspeople in Australia